Andranik Semovich Tangian (Melik-Tangyan) (Russian: Андраник Семович Тангян (Мелик-Тангян)); born March 29, 1952) is a Soviet Armenian-German mathematician, political economist and music theorist. Tangian is known for the mathematical theory of democracy, the Third Vote election method, criticism of flexicurity employment strategy and models of artificial perception of music. He is professor of the Institute for Economics (ECON) of the Karlsruhe Institute of Technology.

Biography
Andranik Tangian was born in Moscow, Soviet Union, on March 29, 1952. After the graduation from the Faculty of Mechanics and Mathematics of the Moscow State University in 1974, he has worked at the Gubkin Russian State University of Oil and Gas and the Central Economic Mathematical Institute of the Academy of Sciences of the Soviet Union, where he got his PhD in mathematics in 1979.

From 1980 to 1983 he worked as assistant professor at the Academy of National Economy under the Government of the Russian Federation and since 1983 as senior researcher at the Dorodnitsyn Computing Centre of the Academy of Sciences of the Soviet Union, where he received habilitation in mathematics in 1989.

As a self-taught composer, he debuted with orchestral music to the play The Last Trimester at the Moscow  in 1977 and then has attended the class of Edison Denisov at the Moscow State Conservatory for two years. At the Computing Centre of the Academy of Sciences, Tangian organized the first Soviet computer music seminar and has cooperated with the Union of Soviet Composers.

On the invitation of Professor , Tangian spent the academic year 1990/91 at the University of Hagen and published his first monograph on the mathematical theory of democracy. During the next two academic years, Tangian has been visiting professor/researcher at the computer music studio ACROE–LIFIA of the Grenoble Institute of Technology, where he has written a monograph on artificial perception and music. In parallel, he has taught calculus and probability at the department of mathematical methods in economics of the University of Paris I (Sorbonne).

From 1993 to 2002 Tangian was in charge of a project of the German Research Foundation (DFG) on constructing objective functions for econometric decision models at the University of Hagen,
where he received the German habilitation in mathematical economics and became Privatdozent in 1988.

At the same time, he has created the course "Decision making in politics and economics" at the Karlsruhe Institute of Technology. There, Tangian received his habilitation in general economics in 2008 and professor title in 2009. Basing on this course, Tangian has published two monographs on the mathematical theory of democracy.

Works

Mathematical theory of democracy

Combining the social choice and public choice approaches, Tangian's theory mathematically studies the fundamental concept to modern democracies – that of political representation. For this purpose, several indices of representativeness are introduced and used for both theoretical analysis and applications.

Third Vote election method

The method developed within the framework of the Mathematical theory of democracy assumes that instead of casting votes for candidates by name, electors give Yes/No-answers to political questions as raised in the candidates' manifestos. The balance of public opinion on these issues thus identified is then used to find the most representative candidates and form the most representative parliament.

Decision theory

For decision models, Tangian has developed several methods for constructing objective functions (= composite indices that embody decision-makers' preferences). In particular, they are applied to optimize budgets for 16 Westphalian universities and the European subsidies to 271 German regions for equalizing unemployment rates.

Flexicurity 

Tangian's ten empirical models of flexicurity — the European policy intended to compensate the flexibilization of employment by social security measures — show that it fails to meet expectations. Alternatively, the job quality indicators developed within this research are proposed for the workplace tax that, by analogy with the green tax, should charge employers for bad working conditions considered "social pollution".

Inequality

According to Tangian, the current rise in inequality is caused, among other things, by the increasing productivity, which enables to underpay workers in so-called "labor equivalents", maintaining nevertheless an impression of fair pay, and use the surplus profit to enrich the upper strata of the society.

Artificial perception and automatic notation of music

The approach implements Tangian's principle of correlativity of perception for structuring data without knowing the structures, which is based on memory-saving representations. This model is used for polyphonic voice separation/chord recognition and tempo tracking under variable tempo.

Modeling interpretation

Tangian has proposed to segment the musical text with respect to the segment functions and show the segments using tempo envelopes, dynamics and other execution techniques. All of these are displayed in a conditional "orchestral score".
This idea is also applied to theatrical performance and its notation.

Algorithmic composition

In the 2000s, Tangian has developed algorithms for finding rhythmic canons and fugues, i.e. polyphonic structures generated by one or two rhythmic patterns that in their interaction produce a regular pulse train, however, with no coinciding time events from different voices. As harmony algorithms, 2D and 3D proximity maps for major and minor keys and chords have been developed.

Family
Tangian belongs to the Armenian noble family Melik-Tangyan, which is mentioned in Armenian chronicles since the 10th century.
Tangian's father, Sema Tanguiane, was the UNESCO Assistant Director General for Education from 1975 to 1987. Tangian's mother, Avgousta Moussatova, was university teacher of Spanish.

Tangian lives with his wife Olga Trifonova, daughter of the Soviet writer Yury Trifonov, in Düsseldorf. They have three children: Ekaterina, Nina Römer and Mikhail.

References

External links
 

1952 births
Living people
German political scientists
Voting theorists
20th-century German mathematicians
21st-century German mathematicians
German economics writers
German political philosophers
German philosophers
Moscow State University alumni
Welfare economists
Mathematical economists
Karlsruhe Institute of Technology
21st-century American non-fiction writers
American male non-fiction writers